Sumner-Glenwood is a neighborhood in U.S. city of Minneapolis. It is located in the broader Near North community and the area is referred to as Heritage Park by the neighborhood association. Summer-Glenwood is roughly contained by 15 city blocks bordered to the north by 11th Avenue North, to the south by Glenwood Avenue, to the east by Interstate 94, and to the west by both Girard Terrace and Emerson Avenue North. (2)

Demographics 
Prior to 1998, the neighborhood had 3,336 residents. 66% were Asian, Hmong, Native Hawaiian or other Pacific Islander, 29% were Black, and 5% were White.  Almost all of these people lived in public housing. Most notably was the Hmong community, many of whom resided in Sumner-Glenwood in the late 1980s up until the demolishing of the housing projects.

As of 2020, the population of Sumner-Glenwood was 2,768, split 46.8% male and 53.2% female 81.5% of residents were at least a high school graduate (or equivalent). 

20.1% of the population were foreign-born residents, and 40.3% spoke a language other than English at home. 18.2% of residents spoke English less than "very well 

28.0% of households had no access to a vehicle. Among workers 16 years and older, 84.8% commuted to work via car. The medium household income in Sumner-Glenwood was $39,609. 30.2% of residents lived below the poverty line. 62.9% of housing in the neighborhood was renter-occupied.

History 
The Sumner Field Homes, constructed by the WPA in 1938, were the first federally subsidized homes in Minnesota.  The homes were demolished in 1998, along with high-rise project housing buildings constructed in the 1960s and 1970s.  According to the US Census (1), the area experienced a 95.7% population loss from 3,336 in 1990 to 144 in 2000.  Plans are in place to rebuild the area, re-incorporating it into surrounding street grids.  Buildings following the "New Urbanism" style will mix affordable and market-rate units, and will replace the old project housing.

The new community, developed by McCormack Baron Salazar, was funded with HOPE VI grants.  The community has been renamed Heritage Park, and includes mixed-income rental and owned units. One of the new streets in this development, Van White Memorial Boulevard, is named for Van Freeman White, the first African-American to serve on the Minneapolis City Council.

In addition to mixed-income rentals, the Heritage Park Master Association represents the owners of single-family houses, townhouses, and condominiums in the neighborhood.

References

External links 
 Heritage Park Neighborhood Association

Neighborhoods in Minneapolis